Harrison Carlos Kelsey (June 30, 1889 - July 10, 1958) served in the California State Assembly for the 41st district from 1927 to 1929. During World War I he served in the United States Army.

References

United States Army personnel of World War I
Republican Party members of the California State Assembly
1889 births
1958 deaths
People from Alameda County, California